Ryes War Cemetery is a Second World War cemetery of Commonwealth soldiers located close to the commune of Bazenville,  east of Bayeux, Normandy, France. The graveyard contains 653 Commonwealth war graves, one Polish and 335 German war graves. The cemetery is maintained by the Commonwealth War Graves Commission.

History
The cemetery lies close to the town of Arromanches and the first interments in the cemetery were made two days after the initial D-Day landings on 6 June 1944. Some of the soldiers buried here are from the 50th (Northumbrian) Infantry Division that landed on Gold Beach. The cemetery also contains a large number of Royal Navy and merchant navy sailors.

Two brothers, Private Joseph Casson (Durham Light Infantry) and Marine Robert Casson (45 Commando) are buried beside each other in the graveyard. Professional footballer Les Milner is also buried in the cemetery.

Gallery

Location

See also
 List of military cemeteries in Normandy
 American Battle Monuments Commission
 UK National Inventory of War Memorials
 German War Graves Commission

References

Further reading
 Shilleto, Carl, and Tolhurst, Mike (2008). A Traveler’s Guide to D-Day and the Battle of Normandy. Northampton, Mass.: Interlink.

External links
 

British military memorials and cemeteries
Canadian military memorials and cemeteries
Commonwealth War Graves Commission cemeteries in France
Operation Overlord cemeteries
1944 establishments in France
World War II memorials in France